The 2007 World Table Tennis Championships women's doubles was the 48th edition of the women's doubles championship.
Zhang Yining and Wang Nan defeated Li Xiaoxia and Guo Yue in the final by four sets to nil, to record their third consecutive title and Wang Nan's fifth consecutive title.

Seeds

  Wang Nan /  Zhang Yining (champions)
  Guo Yue /  Li Xiaoxia (final)
  Tie Ya Na /  Zhang Rui (third round)
  Li Jiawei /  Wang Yuegu (semifinals)
  Kim Kyung-ah /  Park Mi-young (semifinals)
  Ai Fujinuma /  Ai Fukuhara (second round)
  Li Nan /  Liu Shiwen (quarterfinals)
  Lau Sui Fei /  Lin Ling (third round)
  Georgina Póta /  Krisztina Tóth (quarterfinals)
  Nikoleta Stefanova /  Wenling Tan Monfardini (second round)
  Elke Schall /  Wu Jiaduo (first round)
  Veronika Heine /  Liu Jia (first round)
  Lee Eun-hee /  Kim Jung-hyun (third round)
  Tatyana Kostromina /  Viktoria Pavlovich (second round)
  Gao Jun /  Wang Chen (third round)
  Sayaka Hirano /  Kasumi Ishikawa (second round)

Finals

Main draw

Top half

Section 1

Section 2

Bottom half

Section 3

Section 4

References

External links
 Players' matches. ITTF.
 WM 2007 Zagreb (Kroatien) (in German). tt-wiki.info.

-
World
2007 in Croatian women's sport